Escape with ET is an Australian fishing show. It is hosted by Andrew Ettingshausen. Its main focus is on fishing, though it also focuses on many water sports (such as white water rafting and wakeboarding), off-road 4WD driving and other outdoors activities.

Escape with ET screened on Nine Network from 1997 to 2004 and moved to Network Ten in 2005.

See also

List of longest-running Australian television series

References

External links
 
 

Nine Network original programming
Network 10 original programming
10 Bold original programming
Fishing television series
Recreational fishing in Australia
1997 Australian television series debuts
2000s Australian television series
2010s Australian television series